The first season of the American animated television series, Rick and Morty originally aired in the United States on Cartoon Network's late night programming block, Adult Swim. It premiered on December 2, 2013 with "Pilot" and ended on April 14, 2014 with "Ricksy Business", with a total of eleven episodes. The first season received critical acclaim.

Cast and characters

The actors and actresses listed below lend their voices to the corresponding animated characters.

Main cast
 Justin Roiland as Rick Sanchez and Morty Smith, the two main characters of the show; Rick is an eccentric mad scientist and Morty is his kind but easily distressed grandson.
 Chris Parnell as Jerry Smith, Rick's son-in-law and Morty's father; a simple-minded and insecure person, who disapproves of Rick's influence over his family.
 Spencer Grammer as Summer Smith, Rick's granddaughter and Morty's sister; a conventional teenager who worries about improving her status among her peers.
 Sarah Chalke as Beth Smith, Rick's daughter and Morty's mother; a generally level-headed person, who is dissatisfied with her marriage.

Guest cast

Other cast members

Other cast members of the season, who each have voiced one or more characters, include: Eric Bauza, Dan Harmon, Phil Hendrie, Brandon Johnson, Ryan Ridley, Kari Wahlgren, Melique Berger, Jess Harnell, Smith Harrison, Maurice LaMarche, Rob Paulsen, Jesse Mendel, Dan Benson, Jackie Buscarino, Echo Kellum, Patricia Lentz, Rob Schrab, Gary Anthony Williams, Steve Agee, Tom Kenny, Vatche Panos, Cree Summer, Reagan Gomez, Megan Adams, Will Jennings, Finnegan Perry, Jeff Bergman, Adam Ray, Scott Chernoff, Rich Fulcher, Tress MacNeille, Nolan North, Alejandra Gollas, Lauren Hillman and Chris Romano.

Episodes

Production
Series co-creator Justin Roiland, John Rice, Jeff Myers, Bryan Newton and Stephen Sandoval served as directors, while Roiland, series co-creator Dan Harmon, Tom Kauffman, Ryan Ridley, Wade Randolph and Eric Acosta served as writers; writer's assistant Mike McMahan was also given writing credit. All episodes in the first season originally aired in the United States on Adult Swim, and are rated TV-14. However, the uncensored version of the episodes released on DVD and Blu-ray are rated TV-MA. 

All episodes from this season were originally produced and broadcast in 16:9 high-definition on both Adult Swim's SD and HD feeds, resulting in the episodes appearing letterboxed on Adult Swim's standard definition feed. This season began production in January 2013.

Reception
The first season has an approval rating of 96% on Rotten Tomatoes based on 28 reviews, with an average rating of 8.19 out of 10. The site's critics consensus reads, "Rick and Morty zaps onto screens and makes an instant impression with its vivid splashes of color, improvisational voice acting, and densely-plotted science fiction escapades -- bringing a surprising amount of heart to a cosmically heartless premise."

Home media
The first season was released on DVD (Region 1) and Blu-ray on October 7, 2014. Before its release, Roiland had confirmed that it would contain uncensored audio tracks.

References

External links 

2013 American television seasons
2014 American television seasons
Rick and Morty seasons